Petite Savanne (French for "little savannah") was a village on the southeast side of Dominica. It had an estimated population of 1,200 in 2015. The region the town was built on features some of Dominica's steepest terrain; the slopes were composed largely of silt and clay.

On August 27, 2015, Tropical Storm Erika produced torrential rainfall across Dominica, triggering catastrophic flash flooding and mudslides. Throughout the nation, Erika killed up to 30 people and inflicted EC$1.3 billion (US$482.8 million) in damage. Multiple landslides devastated Petite Savanne. At least 6 fatalities occurred in the community and a further 14 people were reported missing. A total of 217 homes were destroyed there, accounting for almost 60 percent of the total homes destroyed by the storm. Prime Minister Roosevelt Skerrit declared the village a special disaster area in light of the tremendous damage. A mandatory and permanent evacuation of all residents was subsequently implemented. The majority were to be relocated to Roseau. The village was initially isolated for several days, and only accessible by sea or air even a week after the storm. Owing to unstable terrain, the area was declared unsafe and off-limits to all travel for more than two months after Erika.

The destruction of Petite Savanne forced the evacuation of 823 people; the village was later deemed uninhabitable and a new town needed to be built elsewhere. Plans for a new settlement, comprising 500–1,000 homes, were established in February 2016.

References

Populated places in Dominica
Saint Patrick Parish, Dominica